The Ambassador is a 1960 West German drama film directed by Harald Braun and starring Nadja Tiller, Hansjörg Felmy and James Robertson Justice.

The film's sets were designed by Fritz Maurischat, Arno Richter and Hermann Warm.

Cast
Nadja Tiller as Helen Cuttler
Hansjörg Felmy as Jan Möller
James Robertson Justice as Robert Morrison
Irene von Meyendorff as Ruth Ryan
Günther Schramm as Jim Cowler
Joseph Offenbach as Monsieur Labiche
Ilse Trautschold
Harald Maresch as Burgsteller
Martin Berliner as Bill Clark
Brigitte Rau as Dorothy, secretary
Hans Leibelt as President of the Republic
Eva Pflug as Miss Caldwell
Walter Tarrach as Protokollchef
Ingeborg Wellmann
Käte Alving
Heinz Spitzner
Hans Paetsch
Wilhelm Borchert as minister of foreign affairs

References

External links

West German films
German drama films
1960 drama films
Films directed by Harald Braun
Films based on Austrian novels
Films set in the United States
Films about journalists
1960s German-language films
1960s German films